KJFF (1400 AM) is a radio station licensed to Festus, Missouri, United States.  The station airs a News-Talk format, and is owned by Alpha Media, through licensee Alpha Media Licensee LLC.

References

External links
KJFF's webpage

JFF
News and talk radio stations in the United States
Alpha Media radio stations